Cedric Laquon Killings (born December 14, 1977) is former American football defensive tackle of the National Football League.  He was originally signed by the San Francisco 49ers as an undrafted free agent in 2000.  He played college football at Carson–Newman University.

In his eight-year career, Killings played for the 49ers, Cleveland Browns, Carolina Panthers, Minnesota Vikings, Washington Redskins and the Houston Texans.  He retired following the 2007 NFL season after suffering a fractured vertebra with the Texans.

Early years
He was an All-Dade and All-State performer as a senior at Miami Central High School and also earned All-Dade and All-State honors in the discus and shot put.

Professional career

Killings was signed as an undrafted free agent by San Francisco 49ers on April 27, 2000.  He was released by the 49ers on August 29, 2001.  He was signed by Cleveland Browns on October 16, 2001, but released by the Browns on November 7, 2001.  He was signed by the Carolina Panthers on November 28, 2001 and granted free agency on March 1, 2002.  Killings was signed by the Minnesota Vikings on June 20, 2002 and released by the Vikings on September 1, 2002.  He was re-signed by Vikings on October 29, 2002 and released by Vikings on December 10, 2002.  He was re-signed by the Vikings on December 16, 2002.

Killings was on the 53-man roster for the Vikings for 14 games in 2003, but was inactive.

Killings signed with the Redskins and was assigned to Rhein Fire in the 2004 NFL Europe enhancement allocation program on February 9, 2004.  He was assigned #78 during the 2004 pre-season.  He was released by the Redskins on September 5, 2004.

The Washington Redskins re-signed Killings for depth on Dec. 8, 2004, when the team placed defensive end Phillip Daniels on injured reserve.  Although Killings was on the 53-man roster and was assigned #91, he was not activated for any of the remaining four games.

Killings was granted unconditional free agency on March 2, 2005 and re-signed by Redskins on March 8, 2005.

In 2005, Killings played in ten regular season games with the Washington Redskins, and started in one.  In addition, he played in two playoff games.

Killings was granted unconditional free agency on March 11, 2006 and re-signed by the Redskins on March 16, 2006.  He was released by the Redskins on September 2, 2006 and signed by Houston Texans on November 14, 2006.  He was  released by Texans on Sept. 1, 2007 and re-signed by Texans on Sept. 14, 2007.

Killings was placed on the reserve/injured list on Sept. 25, 2007 with a neck injury.

Career-ending injury
Killings was involved in a head-to-head collision during the second quarter of a game against the Indianapolis Colts on September 23, 2007 and had to be taken off the field in a stretcher.  Trainers said he was complaining of numbness in his lower extremities, but was able to move them.  He also sustained a deep cut under his right eye.  A Houston Methodist Hospital spokesperson said that Killings could move all of his extremities but was complaining of numbness coming and going in his lower back area.

NFL rule change
The Texans' Harry Williams, a receiver, and Cedric Killings, a defensive lineman, both saw their careers end in sudden, frightening fashion because of wedge-related neck injuries during the 2007 season.

The NFL's rules were subsequently changed.  They now state that once the ball has been kicked, no more than two receiving team players can be within 2 yards of each other on the same yard line, or to quote Texans special teams coach Joe Marciano, “shoulder pad to shoulder pad.”

“Everybody else has to be 3 yards away,” Marciano said. “So we're telling our guys 4 yards to stay out of any gray area. The penalty is just too severe to take chances.”

Violation of this rule will result in a 15-yard penalty for unsportsmanlike conduct.

Personal life
Killings and his wife Shavon have three children.

References

1977 births
Living people
Players of American football from Miami
American football defensive tackles
Carson–Newman Eagles football players
San Francisco 49ers players
Cleveland Browns players
Carolina Panthers players
Minnesota Vikings players
Washington Redskins players
Houston Texans players